Where Meager Die Of Self Interest is the second studio album by American christian punk group Ninety Pound Wuss, released in 1997 through Tooth & Nail Records. The album shows a shift in style from their self-titled debut, with the lyrics being much more mature and the music growing darker.

Track listing

Personnel

Ninety Pound Wuss
Jeff Suffering - Vocals, keyboards
John Himmelberger - Guitar on 1, 5, 6, 7, 9, 11, 12, and 14, background vocals
John Spalding - Guitar on 2, 3, 4, 8, 10, and 13
Dale Yob - Bass, background vocals
Marty Martinez - Drums

Additional Performers
Marty W. - Background vocals
Johnathan F. - Background vocals
Aaron Warner - Background vocals

Production
Tim Mac - Recording, mixing
Aaron Warner - Engineering
Brain Gardner - Mastering
Suzy Hutchinson - Layout

References

External links

1997 albums
Ninety Pound Wuss albums